Cora Creydt is a German former professional tennis player.

A left-handed player from Düsseldorf, Creydt originally competed on tour under her maiden name of Schediwy.

Creydt won through to the second round of the 1968 French Open, where she lost a close match to Anna Dmitrieva, 6–8 in the third set. She also had main draw appearances at Wimbledon and made the mixed doubles third round in 1966.

References

External links
 
 

Year of birth missing (living people)
Living people
West German female tennis players
Sportspeople from Düsseldorf
Tennis people from North Rhine-Westphalia